B612 may refer to:
 B 612 (The Little Prince), an asteroid in the novella The Little Prince
 B612 Foundation, a non-profit formed for planetary defense against asteroid and other near-Earth object (NEO) impacts
 Asteroid B-612, an Australian hard rock band
 46610 Bésixdouze, an asteroid named for the home of The Little Prince
 B612 App a photo editing app with filters, retouching and sharing options for smartphones